SDAT Astroturf Hockey Stadium is situated in Kovilpatti,  Thoothukudi District in the Indian state of Tamil Nadu.

SDAT Astroturf Hockey Stadium Kovilpatti  is a field hockey stadium at Kovilpatti, Tamil Nadu, India. Stadium is  Located at the foot of the Kathiresan malai murugan kovil
(kathiresan kovil) hill.
It was the venue for the 2021 11th Hockey India Junior Men's Championship Trophy (field hockey). In this Stadium, three National level hockey trophy matches were played: in 2019 11th All India Lakshmi Ammal hockey trophy men's team,
2021 11th Hockey India Junior Men's Championship Trophy,
and 2022 12th Hockey India Junior Men's Championship Trophy.
It is also the venue for all division matches of the  Hockey Unit of Tamil Nadu and the home ground of the Kovilpatti team.

Major National Tournament 
 2019

 2021
 

 2022

Major domestic events
 2017 Lakshmi Ammal domestic hockey tournament
2022, 17th Annual State Level Hockey Tournament (Philips Hockey Tournament- SDAT Astroturf Stadium, Kovilpatti 7/3/2022 to 11/3/2022)

Title Winners

National Level Title Winners

Domestic inter state Level Title Winners

11th Hockey India Junior
11th Hockey India Junior Men National Championship2021 , at
Kovilpatti, Tamil Nadu
 Totally 30 junior Men's team participated in the 11th Hockey India Junior Men's National Championship 2021

12th Hockey India Junior
12th Hockey India Junior Men National Championship2022 ,at
Kovilpatti, Tamil Nadu
2022
17/May/2022 - 29/May/2022
Totally 30 junior Men's team participated in the 12th Hockey India Junior Men's National Championship 2022

Match Schedule

Mountain view
Stadium is Located at the foot of the (Kathiresan malai murugan kovil) Hill and near tiger cave Kovilpatti

References

External links 

 SPORTS DEVELOPMENT AUTHORITY OF TAMILNADU

Sports venues in Tamil Nadu
Thoothukudi district